Caranga is one of eight parishes in Proaza, a municipality within the province and autonomous community of Asturias, in northern Spain. 

Villages
 Caranga d'Abaxu
 Caranga d'Arriba

Parishes in Proaza